Ismail Elfath (born March 3, 1982) is a Moroccan-born American soccer referee for the Professional Referee Organization.  He has been a referee in Major League Soccer since 2012 and a FIFA listed referee since 2016.

Early life 
Elfath immigrated to the United States in 2001 at the age of 18 after winning a diversity visa lottery. Elfath graduated from the University of Texas at Austin with a degree in mechanical engineering in 2006. As of 2022, Elfath resides in Austin, Texas.

Career 
Elfath was first a Fourth official in MLS in 2011 and made his MLS refereeing debut in 2012. Elfath became a FIFA listed official in 2016.

Elfath was the referee during an August 2016 match between New York Red Bulls II and Orlando City B where the worldwide first on-field Video Assistant Referee review took place as the system was being tested in USL.

On March 26, 2019, Elfath was selected to referee the 2019 FIFA U-20 World Cup in Poland. Elfath, along with American assistant referees Corey Parker and Kyle Atkins, was selected by FIFA to officiate the final of the tournament, which Ukraine won 3-1 over South Korea.

On May 17, 2019, Elfath was appointed to officiate in the 2019 CONCACAF Gold Cup in the United States following his participation in the 2019 FIFA U-20 World Cup.

Later that year Elfath took charge of the semi-final match at the FIFA Qatar 2019 Club World Cup.

Elfath was named the MLS Referee of the Year for the first time in his career on November 18, 2020. He received the honor for a second time two years later on October 14, 2022.

In July 2021, Elfath took charge of three matches at the Tokyo 2020 Olympics, including a quarter -final match between host nation Japan and New Zealand.

Elfath was chosen as one of the two referees from CONCACAF for the 2021 Africa Cup of Nations held in Cameroon from January 9 to February 6, 2022.

In the 2022 FIFA World Cup in Qatar, Elfath refereed two group stage games,the Round of 16 match between Japan and Croatia, and was the fourth official for the  Final between Argentina and France.

See also
List of football referees

References

External links 
  (archive)

1982 births
Living people
CONCACAF Champions League referees
CONCACAF Gold Cup referees
Major League Soccer referees
American soccer referees
American people of Moroccan descent
2022 FIFA World Cup referees
FIFA World Cup referees
Moroccan emigrants to the United States